The Light Rail Transit Line 2, also known as LRT Line 2 (LRT-2) or Megatren, is a rapid transit line in Metro Manila in the Philippines, generally running in an east–west direction along the Radial Road 6 and a portion of the Circumferential Road 1, referred to as the Purple Line, and previously known as the Mass Rapid Transit Line 2 or MRT Line 2 (MRT-2).

Although the line is operated by the Light Rail Transit Authority, resulting in it being called as "LRT-2", it is actually a heavy rail, rapid transit line. Instead of the light rail vehicles used in earlier lines, it uses very large metro cars, longer and wider than those used on the PNR network, and roughly the same size as those used on the MTR in Hong Kong, MRT in Bangkok and Singapore, and the heavy metro lines of the Taipei Metro. Until the opening of MRT Line 7 (MRT-7) in 2022 and the Metro Manila Subway (MMS) in 2025, it is the country's only line using these types of trains.

Envisioned in the 1970s as part of the Metropolitan Manila Strategic Mass Rail Transit Development Plan, the thirteen-station,  line was the third rapid transit line to be built in Metro Manila when it started operations in 2003. The line became the first rapid transit line extending outside the Metro Manila area after its extension to Antipolo, Rizal opened in 2021. It is operated by the Light Rail Transit Authority (LRTA), a government-owned and controlled corporation attached to the Department of Transportation (DOTr).

Serving close to 200,000 passengers daily before the COVID-19 pandemic in the country, the line is the least busy among Metro Manila's three rapid transit lines, and was built with standards such as barrier-free access and the use of magnetic card tickets to facilitate passenger access in mind. Total ridership however is significantly below the line's built maximum capacity, with various solutions being proposed or implemented to increase ridership in addition to the planned extensions to the line. However, the short-term solutions have had a minimal effect on ridership, and experts have insisted that the extensions be built immediately, despite pronouncements that the system is steadily increasing ridership each year. Regardless, the line encounters periods of peak ridership during rush hour in the morning and the evening.

The line is integrated with the public transit system in Metro Manila, and passengers also take various forms of road-based public transport, such as buses and jeepneys, to and from a station to reach their intended destination. Although the line aimed to reduce traffic congestion and travel times along R-6 and portions of C-1, the transportation system has only been partially successful due to the rising number of motor vehicles and rapid urbanization. Expanding the network's revenue line to accommodate more passengers is set on tackling this problem.

Future plans include a three-station westbound extension in the City of Manila by 2024 and another proposed eastbound extension from  station in Masinag towards Cogeo and downtown Antipolo.

Route

The rail line serves the cities that Radial Road 6 (Marcos Highway, Aurora Boulevard, Ramon Magsaysay Boulevard, Legarda Street and Recto Avenue) passes through: Manila, San Juan, Quezon City, Marikina, Pasig (depot), and Antipolo. The rails are mostly elevated and erected either over or along the roads covered, with sections below ground before and after the  station, the only underground station on the line.

Stations
The line serves 13 stations along its  route. The western terminus of the line is the  station at Recto Avenue, while the eastern terminus of the line is the  station along Marcos Highway.

No stations are connected to other rapid transit lines within the paid areas.

Operations
The line currently runs from 5:00 a.m. PST (UTC+8) until 9:30 p.m. on a daily basis. It operates almost every day of the year unless otherwise announced.  Special schedules are announced via the PA system at every station and also in newspapers and other mass media.  During Holy Week, a public holiday in the Philippines, the rail system is closed for annual maintenance, owing to fewer commuters and traffic around the metro. Normal operation resumes after Easter Sunday. During the Christmas and year-end holidays, the operating hours of the line are modified and shortened, due to the low ridership of the line during the holidays.

History

Planning and early delays
During the construction of the first line of the Manila Light Rail Transit System in the early 1980s, a Swiss company called Electrowatt Engineering Services designed a comprehensive plan for metro service in Metro Manila.  The plan—still used as the basis for planning new metro lines—consisted of a  network of rapid transit lines spanning all major corridors within 20 years, including a line on the Radial Road 6 alignment, one of the region's busiest road corridor.

A feasibility study for the LRT Line 2 that would connect Marikina to the City of Manila via Aurora Boulevard and Ramon Magsaysay Boulevard was carried out in 1988. The project was to be bid out as a build-operate-transfer project together with the LRT Line 1 capacity expansion project in 1989. Although sixteen firms were reported to have submitted bids for the line's construction, the bidding failed, causing delays. Another feasibility study was conducted in 1991 with financing from the Overseas Economic Cooperation Fund (OECF). The final revised project was approved in 1995 as a separate project from the LRT-1 capacity expansion project.

Construction and opening
The LRT Line 2 project officially began in 1996, twelve years after the opening of Line 1, with the granting of the official development assistance loans from the Japan Bank for International Cooperation for the line's construction starting in March of that year. The LRTA would have ownership of the system and assume all administrative functions, such as the regulation of fares and operations as well as the responsibility over construction and maintenance of the system and the procurement of spare parts for trains.

Construction started in 1997 after the LRTA signed the first three packages of the agreement with Sumitomo Corporation delivering Package 1 in which covers the construction of the depot and its facilities, while the Hanjin-Itochu joint venture delivered packages 2 and 3 in which covers the substructure and the superstructure plus the stations respectively.

The project suffered delays in 1998 when the fourth package of the project, which includes the communications and fares systems, vehicles, and trackworks, were alleged to had irregularities with the contract. In September 2000, Package 4 was awarded to the Asia-Europe MRT Consortium (AEMC), a consortium of local and foreign companies led by Marubeni Corporation and composed of Balfour Beatty, Toshiba, Daewoo Heavy Industries, and a local company which was D.M. Consuji Incorporated (DMCI). AEMC, through Marubeni Corporation, entered into a contract with Singapore Technologies Engineering on December 12 of that year to supply and install the communications system, supervisory control and data acquisition (SCADA) system, automatic fare collection system, and the management information system. The consortium provided the eighteen four-car trainsets built by Rotem and Toshiba.

During construction, the LRTA, along with the project consultants oversaw all the design, construction, equipping, testing, commissioning, and technical supervision of the project activities. Halcrow was appointed in 1997 as the lead consultant for the project.

The pre-casting segmental method, a method used to launch girders and connect them to create a full span, was used in the construction of the original  line (except the  underground section in Katipunan).

Due to the absence of seamless interconnection between the initial section and the section beyond Araneta Center-Cubao, westbound passengers alighted at Cubao station before riding a train to V. Mapa. An estimated 3,000 passengers took the ride during the three-day test run. All remaining stations that are part of the line's second phase opened on April 5, 2004, except for Recto which opened on October 29, 2004. However, ridership was initially moderate yet still far below expectations, since the passenger volume in this line is not yet fully achieved.

To address passenger complaints on the lack of universal access on earlier train lines, the LRTA made sure during the construction phase that the stations were equipped with universal access by putting up escalators and elevators for easier access, as well as making passenger fares at par with the other existing lines. However, while all stations have elevators to and from the platform, not all stations have elevators to and from the station concourse on both sides of the road.

East extension

Plans to extend the line to Antipolo were first laid out as part of Metro Manila Urban Transportation Integration Study Master Plan by the Japan International Cooperation Agency (JICA) in 1999. The extension was first approved by the Investment Coordination Committee (ICC) board of the National Economic and Development Authority (NEDA) in October 2003. The Light Rail Transit Authority announced its intention to extend the line eastward to Antipolo in 2006. The project aims to accommodate an additional 80,000 passengers and reduce traffic congestion along Marcos Highway.

The Light Rail Transit Authority secured funds for the project from Philippine banks in May 2011. In October 2011, the Japan International Cooperation Agency released a feasibility study report for the project. The  extension, starting from the eastern terminus of Santolan Station up to Antipolo station in Antipolo, calls for two additional stations, Marikina station in Barangay San Roque, Marikina near Sta. Lucia East Grand Mall; and Antipolo station, in Barangay Mayamot, Antipolo near SM City Masinag. The ₱9.7 billion project, at its current form, was approved by the National Economic and Development Authority chaired by then-President Benigno Aquino III on September 4, 2012. The Philippine national government funded the civil works packages, while the Japan International Cooperation Agency funded the electrical and mechanical systems package as part of its Capacity Enhancement of Mass Transit Systems in Metro Manila Project, wherein JICA allotted ¥43.2 billion for various extension and capacity expansion projects of railway lines in Metro Manila.

The civil works packages, Packages 1 and 2, covered the design and construction of the viaduct and stations, respectively. Both packages were awarded to D.M. Consunji Incorporated (DMCI). Package 3, awarded to Marubeni and DMCI, covered the design and installation of the railway tracks and electrical and mechanical (E&M) systems of the extension.

A groundbreaking ceremony was held on June 9, 2015 to mark the start of construction of the extension. Another groundbreaking ceremony was held on May 30, 2017 to mark the start of construction of the two stations. The final phase of construction, covering the installation of the tracks, electrical and mechanical systems, commenced on April 16, 2019.

During construction, on March 10, 2017, a truck slammed in a concrete post of the east extension viaduct, killing one and injuring two people.

Unlike the original line which used the pre-casting segmental method of construction, the east extension viaduct made use of AASHTO girders with a deck slab above the girders.

The east extension was originally expected to be completed in the fourth quarter of 2020. However, construction delays brought by the COVID-19 pandemic delayed its opening. The extension was initially set to open in April 2021, but was postponed twice. After series of delays, the extension opened on July 5, 2021 after being inaugurated on July 1 by President Rodrigo Duterte. The Light Rail Transit Authority offered free rides for the East Extension stations for two weeks from its opening.

The opening of the east extension was met with long lines and inconveniences reported by passengers. These include the lack of trains in the line and the inefficient shuttle service between Santolan and Antipolo pending signaling integration works (of which only one train served this temporary service, causing waiting times that can reach as long as 20 to 30 minutes). Seamless end-to-end train services begun on September 3 after integration works were completed.

LRT Line 2 is planned to be further extended eastward up to Cogeo, and the Antipolo city government is very supportive of the project.

Station facilities, amenities, and services

With the exception of  station, all stations are above ground.

Station layout and accessibility
Stations have a standard layout, with a concourse level and a platform level. The concourse is usually below the platform except for the underground station, with stairs, escalators and elevators leading down to the platform level. The levels are separated by fare gates. All stations are barrier-free inside and outside the station, and trains have spaces for passengers using wheelchairs.

The concourse contains ticket booths.

Part of the platform at the front of the train is cordoned off for the use of pregnant women, children, elderly, and persons with disabilities. At side-platform stations, passengers are able to switch platforms at the concourse level without leaving the closed system, while passengers can easily switch sides at stations with island platforms. Stations have toilets at the concourse level, both inside and outside the closed system.

The last car of each train are also designated as "green zones", where folding bicycle users can ride with their bikes.

The line has a total of 72 escalators and 40 elevators across all 13 stations. However, by 2021, only a few elevators and escalators remain operational due to anomalies and corruption involving the procurement contracts, causing complaints from passengers. The elevators and escalators are being repaired and restored since 2022, and more are being repaired and restored as of April 2022.

Shops and services
Inside the concourse of all stations is at least one stall or stand where people can buy food or drinks. Stalls vary by station, and some have fast food stalls.  The number of stalls also varies by station, and stations tend to have a wide variety, especially in stations such as Recto and V. Mapa.

Stations such as Recto and Santolan are connected to or are near shopping malls and/or other large shopping areas, where commuters are offered more shopping varieties.

In cooperation with the Philippine Daily Inquirer, passengers are offered a copy of the Inquirer Libre, a free, tabloid-size, Tagalog version of the Inquirer, which is available from 6 a.m. at all stations.

Ridership
The line is designed and was forecasted to carry 570,000 passengers daily. However, the line operates under its designed capacity since its opening, government officials have admitted that system extensions are overdue, although in the absence of major investment in the system's expansion, LRTA has resorted to experimenting with and/or implementing other solutions to maximize the use of the system, including having bus feeder lines.

Before the pandemic, the line had a ridership of 200,000 passengers, but the ridership soon decreased in 2019 due to lack of trains and a power trip that closed three stations in October 2019 that was reopened in January 2021.

Statistics

Rolling stock

The line runs sixteen electric multiple units made in South Korea by Hyundai Rotem powered by Toshiba-made VVVF inverters. The trains came in together with the fourth package during the system's construction. The four-car trains have a capacity of 1,628 passengers, which is more than the normal capacity of the rolling stock of Lines 1 and 3. These trains prominently use wrap advertising.

In 2017, the entire train fleet was retrofitted with the TUBE (formerly known as PARDS), a passenger information system powered by LCD screens installed near the ceiling of the train that shows news, advertisements, current train location, arrivals and station layouts.

In 2019, the train ventilation was upgraded to replace the aging air-conditioning units and to alleviate complaints of the commuters for uncomfortable hot rides. Two years later, three train sets underwent refurbishment and resulted in new fitted propulsion systems and train monitoring systems from Woojin Industrial Systems.

The LRTA is also acquiring 14 additional train sets by 2020 to augment the existing 18 sets, due to the expected increase of passengers ahead of the East Extension, and the West Extension. The purchase however was delayed to 2022.

Included in the design-and-build contract of the west extension is the procurement of five four-car train sets.

Depot
The line maintains an at-grade depot in Barangay Santolan in Pasig, near Santolan station in the side of Barangay Calumpang in Marikina. It is connected to the mainline network by a spur line.

The depot is capable of storing 24 sets of electric multiple units, with the option to expand to include more vehicles as demand arises. They are parked on several sets of tracks, which converge onto the spur route and later on to the main network.

There are eight decommissioned 1000 class and one set of 1100 class trains formerly used in LRT Line 1 being stored in this depot due to the expansion of the Line 1 depot in Parañaque.

Other infrastructure

Signalling
The line uses a fixed block system with automatic train control (ATC), which has three subsystems: automatic train protection (ATP), automatic train operation (ATO), and Rail9000 automatic train supervision (ATS). The ATO subsystem automatically drives the trains, while the opening and closing of doors is controlled by an onboard train attendant. The ATP system, meanwhile, maintains safe operations and monitors the train's speed. Lastly, the Rail9000 ATS system is located at the operations control center at the line's Santolan Depot, which directs train operations and monitors the train movement along the line. Other components of the signalling system includes train detection through track circuits and Westrace MK1 computer-based interlocking.

The signalling equipment were manufactured by Westinghouse Signals. Westinghouse Signals, later renamed as Westinghouse Rail Systems, became part of Siemens Mobility after its acquisition by Siemens in 2013.

The signalling system is set to be upgraded with the replacement of the system's communication link and the upgrading of the interlocking module. The project started on February 15, 2022.

Tracks
The rails are  rails designed to the UIC 54 rail profile. The rails are supported by concrete plinths.

Plans and proposals

West extension
A  extension of the line to the Manila North Harbor in Tondo, Manila has been proposed. It was first announced in August 2006, when the LRTA announced its intention to extend the line eastward to Antipolo and westward to the Pier 4 of the Manila North Harbor. It was approved by the National Economic and Development Authority (NEDA) on May 19, 2015. The construction of this extension would create three stations, one near the Tutuban PNR station, one in Divisoria, and one near the North Port Passenger Terminal in Manila North Harbor's Pier 4 which would serve as its terminus. In an interview, LRTA Administrator Ret. Gen. Reynaldo Berroya stated that they are aiming to finish the project by 2022 to 2023.

The total project cost is estimated to be ₱10.12 billion. In 2019, WESTRAX Joint Venture was awarded the contract for the consultancy services for the project.

On August 27, 2020, the Light Rail Transit Authority published the bidding documents for the design-and-build contract for the west extension. According to the documents, the turn back area after the  station will have three tracks; two of which are the main tracks and one serves as a pocket track. The three stations will feature side platforms.

The project was originally planned to be funded through a public-private partnership (PPP) scheme, in line with the Marcos administration's policy to use the said scheme to complete various infrastructure projects. The contract would have also covered the procurement of five new four-car trains, along with the maintenance of the line and the refurbishment of the trains. However, it was decided that the government will instead fund the project through the national budget.

Extension to Cogeo 

The Japan International Cooperation Agency has also proposed for a second phase of the east extension to extend the line to Cogeo and downtown Antipolo. There are provisions at the end of the current rail line at Antipolo station for an extension.

As of November 2022, the feasibility study is nearing its conclusion. The extension would have three stations and the alignment is still being finalized.

Privatization 
The privatization of the operations and maintenance of Line 2 was planned by the then-Department of Transportation and Communications (DOTC; later the Department of Transportation as part of the agency's improvement and modernization of the railway lines in the Philippines. The bidding process for this project begun on September 13, 2014. In this project, the interested companies were required to submit pre-qualification documents and submit a bid proposal if the company is qualified for the bidding. In January 2015, four companies submitted pre-qualification documents for the project. The bidders included Aboitiz Equity Ventures with SMRT Transport Solutions (Aboitiz Equity Ventures and SMRT International Pte Ltd. through SMRT Trains), DMCI Holdings with Tokyo Metro, Light Rail Manila 2 Consortium (RATP and Metro Pacific), and San Miguel Corporation with Korea Railroad Corporation. All bidders were pre-qualified for the bidding. However, the project would eventually be shelved in 2016.

In 2017, it was reported that the Metro Pacific Investments Corporation was interested in a possible auction for the privatization of the line. The plan to privatize the operations and maintenance of the line was restarted in October 2019, following a power trip that damaged two rectifiers. Since then, no new reports have surfaced about this plan as of 2021.

Capacity expansion and upgrade
Due to the aging of the line, a capacity expansion project for the line was announced in April 2022. The project would include upgrades to the trains, signalling, telecommunications, power supply, overhead systems, railway tracks, and other system equipment. The project is still under the stages of the procurement of a consultant for the project, which would assess the current condition of the line.

TÜV Rheinland has been shortlisted for the list of consultants and is the only consultant to be shortlisted in June 2022.

Like the west extension, the upgrading of the train cars would be funded through a public-private partnership scheme. The contract would also cover the maintenance of the line and the construction of the west extension.

Incidents

2000s 
 On July 12, 2006, at 7:30 AM, a lightning struck the power cables near the Santolan station, interrupting train operations.
 On August 15, 2006, at 8:45 AM, a lightning struck the power cables, which is the second incident reported in a month.  Normal operations were restored before 12:00 noon.
 On May 20, 2008, at 6:45 PM, a lightning struck the line's power supply, interrupting operations.
 On July 23, 2008, a power interruption disrupted the line operations, leaving the Santolan-Cubao section only operational.

2010s 
 On June 11, 2011, a man jumped in front of a moving train at the Araneta Center-Cubao station, leaving the man severely injured. This forced the line operations to be suspended.
 On May 9, 2017, at 4:03 PM, a tree fell to the tracks at the Anonas area, causing the line's operations to be disrupted and a 2000 class train nearby was hit. The Department of Public Works and Highways local office was doing roadworks at the site of the incident when they accidentally hit a tree that fell on the tracks. Partial operations between Recto and V. Mapa were implemented, until the line's operations were suspended an hour later. The incident area was cleared and full operations resumed at 7:41 PM.
 On May 30, 2018, a damaged cable between J. Ruiz and V. Mapa stations caused limited operations between Santolan and Araneta Center-Cubao stations at 11:46 AM. Normal operations resumed at 7:46 PM.
 On May 15, 2019, at 7:27 PM, an air pressure glitch halted the operations of Line 2. Operations resumed at 7:47 PM.
 On May 18, 2019, trainset no. 13 broke down between Anonas and Katipunan stations at 2:00 PM and was subsequently moved to the pocket track of Anonas waiting to be towed back to the depot. However at 9:15 PM, the train was reported to have moved on its own towards the eastbound track going towards Santolan station. At this time, trainset no. 18 was going towards Santolan station from Cubao station on the same track. The runaway train was reported via radio but eventually ran into train No. 13, injuring 34 passengers, with none in critical condition. The driver of one of the two trains was reported to have jumped out of his train before the collision, sustaining wounds and bruises. Revenue operations were suspended to give way to maintenance checks, and normal operations resumed at 10:47 AM the next day. Trainset no. 18 returned to service in June 2021, while Trainset no. 13 returned to service in September 2021.
The operations of the line were suspended for safety checks and normal operations resumed at 10:11am.
 On October 3, 2019, another power trip caused rectifier substations located between Anonas and Katipunan stations and in the Santolan depot to catch fire at around 11 in the morning, cutting the line's power supply in the area. Line operations from Recto to Santolan were suspended at 11:24 am, and passengers were evacuated from the line with no injuries. The LRTA, MMDA and the Philippine Coast Guard immediately deployed shuttle buses to help ferry stranded passengers. Partial operations between Cubao and Recto stations resumed on October 8, 2019, while Santolan, Katipunan and Anonas Stations are expected to reopen after nine months. The initial estimated amount of damages is at around PHP428 million. Due to the incident, the Light Rail Transit Authority claimed full operations would be back in 2 to 3 months. As the initial deadline was not met the three stations that were caught in a power trip were expected to resume services at the end of June 2020. However, this deadline was also not met due to delays brought by the COVID-19 pandemic, rescheduled for the first quarter of 2021. Finally, the three stations were reopened, albeit in partial speed, on January 22, 2021. The reopening was made possible by a temporary power supply system installed in the damaged portion while the proper systems are still on order and awaiting delivery.

2020s 
 On October 8, 2020, a fire broke out in the electrical room at  causing the operations to be suspended at 5:10am. The fire damaged the station's uninterruptible power supply. Normal operations returned a few hours later.
 On April 7, 2021, the operations of the LRT-2 were halted due to an unspecified "technical problem." Normal operations resumed at 10:50 AM.
 On May 24, 2021, an unspecified technical problem at Santolan station limited the LRT-2 operations between Recto and Araneta Cubao stations. Full operations resumed the following day.
 On June 17, 2021, a technical problem at the line's control center halted the LRT-2 operations. Normal operations resumed at 4:59pm.
 On August 16, 2021, operations were suspended between Cubao and Santolan due to an unspecified technical problem. Operations resumed at 4:20pm.
 On September 17, 2021, a defective catenary wire at the east extension area caused disruptions in operations. A shuttle service between Santolan and Antipolo was implemented at 9:43 AM. On the same day, the line's operations were briefly suspended at 11:36 AM after a tangled t-shirt was seen hanging at the contact wires between Cubao and Anonas stations. Operations with the shuttle service resumed at 11:49 AM, while full end-to-end operations were known to be resumed the following day.
 On October 9, 2021, an entangled balloon was discovered between V. Mapa and Pureza stations, causing the line's operations to be temporarily suspended. The operations resumed after 30 minutes.
 On November 3, 2021, operations of Line 2 were suspended at 6:00 AM due to a signalling system problem. Operations resumed at 7:57 AM.
 Multiple signalling system problems were reported on November 6, 14, and 25, 2021.
 On July 31, 2022, at 8:00 a.m., operations of Line 2 were limited from Cubao to Antipolo stations due to a broken catenary wire between Legarda and Pureza stations. Full operations resumed the following day at 5:00 a.m.

Notes

References

External links
 Official LRTA website on LRT Line 2

Line 2
Manila Light Rail Transit System Line 2
Transportation in Rizal
Railway lines opened in 2003
2003 establishments in the Philippines
Transportation in Luzon
1500 V DC railway electrification